The Battle of Lake Trasimene was fought when a Carthaginian force under Hannibal ambushed a Roman army commanded by Gaius Flaminius on 21 June 217 BC, during the Second Punic War. The battle took place on the north shore of Lake Trasimene, to the south of Cortona, and resulted in a heavy defeat for the Romans. War had broken out between Rome and Carthage early in 218 BC. Hannibal, ruler of the Carthaginian territories in south-east Iberia, marched an army through Gaul, crossed the Alps and arrived in Cisalpine Gaul (northern Italy) later that year. The Romans rushed reinforcements north from Sicily but were badly defeated at the Battle of the Trebia.

The following spring the Romans positioned an army on each side of the Appenine Mountains, but were surprised when a Carthaginian army more than 50,000 strong crossed the range by a difficult but unguarded route. The Carthaginians moved south into Etruria, plundering, razing the villages and killing all adult males encountered. Flaminius, in charge of the nearest Roman army, set off in pursuit. Hannibal arranged an ambush on the north shore of Lake Trasimene and trapped the Romans. With the Carthaginians attacking unexpectedly from the flank and the rear, possibly in poor visibility, there was no chance for the Romans to form even a rudimentary fighting line and they were defeated after three hours hard fighting. The trap failed to close on the 6,000 Romans at the front of the column, who escaped; later in the day they were surrounded by pursuing Carthaginians and surrendered. Thus all 25,000 Romans in Flaminius's army were killed or captured. This destruction of an entire army as a result of an ambush by another army is widely considered a unique occurrence. Several days later the Carthaginians wiped out the entire cavalry force of the second Roman army, who were not yet aware of the earlier disaster.

The Carthaginians then marched towards southern Italy in the hope of winning over some of the ethnic Greek and Italic city-states. News of the defeat caused a panic in Rome and led to the election of Quintus Fabius Maximus Verrucosus as dictator. Impatient with his Fabian strategy of avoiding major battles, the next year the Romans elected Lucius Paullus and Gaius Varro as consuls. These more aggressive commanders engaged Hannibal at the Battle of Cannae in 216 BC, resulting in a third and even worse disaster for Rome; it was followed by thirteen more years of war.

Background

Pre-war

The First Punic War was fought from 264 to 241 BC between Carthage and Rome: these two main powers of the western Mediterranean in the 3rd century BC struggled for supremacy primarily on the Mediterranean island of Sicily and its surrounding waters and in North Africa. The war lasted for 23 years until the Carthaginians were defeated. Five years later an army commanded by the leading Carthaginian general Hamilcar Barca landed in Carthaginian Iberia (modern south-east Spain) which he greatly expanded and turned into a quasi-monarchical, autonomous territory ruled by the Barcids. This expansion gained Carthage silver mines, agricultural wealth, manpower, military facilities such as shipyards and territorial depth, which encouraged it to resist future Roman demands.

Hamilcar ruled as viceroy until his death in 228 BC. He was succeeded by his son-in-law, Hasdrubal, then his son Hannibal in 221 BC. In 226 BC the Ebro Treaty established the Ebro River as the northern boundary of the Carthaginian sphere of influence in Iberia. A little later Rome made a separate treaty of association with the independent city of Saguntum, well south of the Ebro. In 219 BC a Carthaginian army under Hannibal besieged, captured and sacked Saguntum, which led Rome to declare war on Carthage. 

Meanwhile, the major Gallic tribes in Cisalpine Gaul (modern northern Italy), antagonised by the founding of several Roman settlements on traditionally Gallic territory, attacked the Romans, capturing several towns and repeatedly ambushed a Roman relief force. The Roman Senate reinforced their army in Cisalpine Gaul while also preparing armies to invade Carthaginian territories.

Carthage invades Italy

Hannibal assembled a Carthaginian army in New Carthage (modern Cartagena) and marched north into Gaul in May 218 BC, leaving his brother, Hasdrubal Barca, in charge of Carthaginian interests in Iberia. The Carthaginian army crossed the Alps in October, surmounting the difficulties of climate, terrain and the guerrilla tactics of the native tribes. Hannibal arrived with 20,000 infantry, 6,000 cavalry and an unknown number of elephantsthe survivors of the 37 with which he had left Iberiain Cisalpine Gaul. The Romans had already withdrawn to their winter quarters and were astonished by Hannibal's appearance. 

The Romans went on the attack and the local Roman commander, the consul Publius Scipio, personally led a strong force of cavalry and light infantry against the Carthaginian cavalry at the Battle of Ticinus. He was soundly beaten and personally wounded. The Romans retreated to near Placentia, fortified their camp and awaited reinforcement. The Roman army in Sicily under Sempronius Longus was redeployed to the north and joined with Scipio's force. Numidian cavalry lured Sempronius and his army out of their camp and onto ground of Hannibal's choosing, where the Battle of the Trebia took place. Most of the Romans were killed or captured by the Carthaginians, but 10,000 under Sempronius fought their way to the safety of Placentia.

Prelude

When news of the defeat at the Trebia reached Rome, it caused great alarm. This calmed once Sempronius arrived to preside over the consular elections in the usual manner. Gnaeus Geminus and Gaius Flaminius were selected and Sempronius then returned to Placentia to see out his term to 15 March. The consuls-elect recruited further legions, both Roman and from Rome's Latin allies; reinforced Sardinia and Sicily against the possibility of Carthaginian raids or invasion; placed garrisons at Tarentum and other places for similar reasons; built a fleet of 60 quinqueremes; and established supply depots at Ariminum and Arretium in Etruria in preparation for marching north later in the year. Two armiesof four legions each, two Roman and two allied, but with stronger than usual cavalry contingentswere formed. One was stationed at Arretium and one on the Adriatic coast; they would be able to block Hannibal's possible advance into central Italy and be well positioned to move north to operate in Cisalpine Gaul. In spite of their losses, the Romans fielded twenty-two legions in 217 BC, ten more than in 218 BC. The Gallic tribes in Cisalpine Gaul recognised the Carthaginians as the dominant force and sent plentiful supplies and many recruits to Hannibal's camp.

In spring 217BC, probably in early May, the Carthaginians crossed the Apennines unopposed, taking a difficult but unguarded route and so surprising the Romans. The Carthaginians moved south into Etruria (modern Tuscany), plundering the countryside, looting the plentiful stocks of food, razing the villages and small towns, and killing out of hand all adult males encountered. Hannibal learnt that one Roman army was at Arretium and was eager to bring it to battle, before it could be reinforced: Hannibal surmised the Romans would have another army on the east coast.

Once he learnt that he had been bypassed, Flaminius, the commander of the Roman army at Arretium, set off in pursuit. The modern historian Adrian Goldsworthy points out that as they passed through territory devastated by the Carthaginians there would have been a feeling of military failure and humiliationthe army existed to protect its homelandand that the small farmers of the legions and their landowner officers would have taken this despoliation as an intense provocation. The Romans gained the impression, possibly fostered by Hannibal, that the Carthaginians were fleeing south before them; according to the ancient historian Polybius they anticipated an easy victory. The Romans were pursuing so rapidly that they were unable to carry out proper reconnaissance, but they closed to less than a day's march behind their opponents. The Carthaginians bypassed the Roman-garrisoned city of Cortona and on 20 June marched along the north shore of Lake Trasimene. Hannibal decided this was a suitable spot to turn and fight.

Opposing forces

Roman 

Most male Roman citizens were liable for military service and would serve as infantry, with a better-off minority providing a cavalry component. Traditionally, when at war the Romans would raise two legions, each of 4,200 infantry and 300 cavalry. The balance were equipped as heavy infantry, with body armour, a large shield and short thrusting swords. They were divided into three ranks, of which the front rank also carried two javelins, while the second and third ranks had a thrusting spear instead. Both legionary sub-units and individual legionaries fought in relatively open order. An army was usually formed by combining a Roman legion with a similarly sized and equipped legion provided by their Latin allies, but sometimes consisted of two Roman and two allied legions. Allied legions had a larger attached complement of cavalry than Roman ones. At Lake Trasimene the Romans fielded four legionstwo Roman and two made up of alliesfor a total of approximately 25,000 men.

Carthaginian

Carthage usually recruited foreigners to make up its army. Many would be from North Africa
these were frequently referred to as Libyanswhich provided several types of fighters including: close-order infantry equipped with large shields, helmets, short swords and long thrusting spears; javelin-armed light infantry skirmishers; close-order shock cavalry (also known as "heavy cavalry") carrying spears; and light cavalry skirmishers who threw javelins from a distance and avoided close combat. Both Iberia and Gaul provided experienced infantry; unarmoured troops who would charge ferociously, but had a reputation for breaking off if a combat was protracted. Most of the African infantry would fight in a tightly packed formation known as a phalanx, usually forming two or three lines. Specialist slingers were recruited from the Balearic Islands.

The numbers fielded by the Carthaginians are not known, but an approximation can be made. Hannibal had arrived in Italy with 20,000 infantry and 6,000 cavalry, and had fought at the Trebia in December 218 BC with 31,000 and 11,000 respectively. In the wake of this victory he was further heavily reinforced by local Gauls. In 216 BC the Carthaginians, not having been reinforced since crossing the Apennines, had 40,000 infantry and 10,000 cavalry. It is usually assumed that more than 50,000 fought at Lake Trasimene. In any event, the Carthaginian army was considerably larger than the Roman.

Battle

Setting the ambush 

The shoreline has changed since, but at the time of the battle the road led along the north shore of the lake, then turned south, still along the lakeshore, before climbing away from the lake through a defile. To the north of the road were a range of low hills which came closer to the lake towards the east, steadily reducing the open ground between them and the lake. The Carthaginians made camp where the hills were closest to the lake, near the defile. This was clearly visible to the Romans.

Once it was dark, Hannibal sent the components of his army on night marches behind the hills to the north of the lake to take up positions from which they could ambush the Roman army. Night marches are notoriously difficult and often result in units becoming lost in the dark or alerting their enemy. The Carthaginians avoided both of these and took up positions on the reverse slopes of the hills. The Carthaginian cavalry were positioned furthest to the west, the north-Italian Gallic infantry to their east and the experienced African and Iberian infantry furthest east, relatively close to their camp. Modern historians place the bulk of the many Carthaginian light infantry either around the defile and its mouth or as reinforcing the Gauls in the centre of the Carthaginian line.

On the morning of 21 June the Romans set off very early and marched eastward along the northern edge of the lake. Ancient accounts state that a thick morning mist near the lake limited visibility, but some modern historians have suggested this was either invented or exaggerated to excuse the Romans' subsequent unreadiness for battle. As Flaminius was expecting battle, the Romans probably marched in three parallel columns, which was their habit before a battle as this was relatively quicker to manoeuvre into a battle line compared with a single line of march. This swiftness was relative, as forming an army up in battle order was a complicated affair which would take several hours under any circumstances. The Romans would have had a screen of light infantry out to their front and, to a lesser extent, their flank, as skirmishing was usual before a battle with the armies' respective light troops shielding their close-order colleagues while they formed up. Flaminius did not send out cavalry scouts to make a more distant reconnaissance; Roman armies of the time rarely did so.

Springing the trap 

The leading Romans made contact with the most easterly of the Carthaginians, probably some of the African or Iberian close-order infantry, and the signal was given for all of the Carthaginians to advance, possibly by the sounding of trumpets. According to some ancient accounts the Romans could hear these signals on their flank and to their rear, but could not see their enemy, which caused confusion. It would have taken several hours for the Romans to convert their formation into a battle array, even if they had known which direction to face. As it was, with the Carthaginians attacking unexpectedly from the flank and the rear, possibly with poor visibility, there was no chance to form even a rudimentary fighting line. Some Romans fled, others clustered into groups of various sizes, ready to engage the enemy on all sides. The fugitives and many of the impromptu Roman groups were rapidly cut down or captured. Other groups of Romans put up a stiff fight, especially in the centre, where the attacking Gauls suffered heavy casualties before beating down the trapped Romans after three hours of heavy combat.

According to Polybius, Flaminius was completely surprised and provided no effective leadership. The openly pro-Roman ancient historian Livy, who otherwise paints a poor picture of Flaminius, recorded two centuries later that he was active and valiant in attempting to rally his army and organise a defence before being cut down by a Gaul, Ducarius. The trapped portion of the Roman army collapsed. Men attempted to swim across the lake and drowned; others waded out until the water was up to their necks and the Carthaginian cavalrymen swam their horses out to chop at their exposed heads.

The trap failed to close on the 6,000 Romans at the front of the column, who were possibly also those most prepared for battle, and they pushed their way out of the defile against little opposition. Realising that they could not affect the battle behind them, they marched on. Later in the day they were surrounded by pursuing Carthaginians and surrendered to a force under Maharbal on the promise of being disarmed and freed; "with a garment apiece" according to Livy. Hannibal disapproved and only applied this to the allied captives, while selling the Romans into slavery. Many of the Carthaginian infantry, especially the Libyans, equipped themselves with captured Roman armour.

Casualties and follow up 

The ancient sources are unclear as to the fate of the approximately 25,000 Romans known to have been engaged. According to the contemporary annalist and senator Fabius Pictor 15,000 were killed and 10,000 scattered. The usually reliable Polybius has 15,000 killed and most of the rest captured. Polybius reports losses of 1,500 killed for the Carthaginians, most of them Gauls; Livy gives 2,500 killed on the day and "many" who subsequently died of their wounds.

The second Roman army, originally positioned on the Adriatic coast and commanded by Gnaeus Geminus, had been marching west, intending to join up with Flaminius. Unaware that the destruction of Flaminius's army had left the Carthaginians able to manoeuvre freely, Geminus's entire cavalry force of 4,000 was scouting ahead when it was surprised by the Carthaginians a few days after Trasimene. Nearly 2,000 were killed in the first clash; the balance were surrounded and captured the next day. Geminus withdrew his infantry back to Ariminum (modern Rimini) on the Adriatic.

Aftermath

The Roman prisoners were badly treated by the Carthaginians, but the captured Latin allies were treated well and many were freed and sent back to their cities, in the hope that they would speak highly of Carthaginian martial prowess and of their own treatment. Hannibal hoped some of these allies could be persuaded to defect. The Carthaginians continued their march through Etruria, then Umbria, to the Adriatic coast; continuing their devastation and plundering of the territory they crossed and the killing of any adult males captured; the Gauls were especially brutal in this respect. Contemporary reports claim that the Carthaginian soldiers accumulated so much booty they had to cease looting because they could not carry any more. The army then marched south into Apulia, in the hope of winning over some of the ethnic Greek and Italic city states of southern Italy.

The populace of Rome fell into a panic when word of the defeat was received. Quintus Fabius Maximus Verrucosus was elected dictator by the Roman Assembly and adopted the "Fabian strategy" of avoiding pitched conflict, relying instead on low-level harassment to wear the invader down, until Rome could rebuild its military strength. Hannibal was left largely free to ravage Apulia for the next year, until the Romans ended the dictatorship and elected Paullus and Varro as consuls in 216 BC. These more aggressive commanders offered battle to Hannibal, who accepted and won a victory at Cannae, where some 70,000 Romans were killed or captured; the modern historian Richard Miles describes this as "Rome's greatest military disaster". Subsequently the Carthaginians campaigned in southern Italy for a further 13 years.

In 204 BC Publius Cornelius Scipio, the son of the Scipio who had been wounded at Ticinus, invaded the Carthaginian homeland, defeated the Carthaginians in two major battles and won the allegiance of the Numidian kingdoms of North Africa. Hannibal and the remnants of his army were recalled from Italy to confront him. They met at the Battle of Zama in October 202BC and Hannibal was decisively defeated. As a consequence Carthage agreed a peace treaty which stripped it of most of its territory and power.

Evaluation

According to the modern military historian Basil Liddell Hart, Hannibal had successfully planned and executed "the greatest ambush in history". The ambush and destruction of one army by another is widely considered a unique occurrence, military historian Theodore Dodge commenting, "It is the only instance in history of lying in ambush with the whole of a large army." Similarly, historian Robert O’Connell writes, "[It was] the only time an entire large army was effectively swallowed and destroyed by such a maneuver." The historian Toni Ñaco del Hoyo describes the Battle of Lake Trasimene as one of the three "great military calamities" suffered by the Romans in the first three years of the war, the others being the Trebia and Cannae.

Notes, citations and sources

Notes

Citations

Sources

 
 
 
 
 
 
 
 
 
 
 
 
 
 
 
 
 
 
 
 
 

Trasimene
Trasimene
Trasimene
Trasimene
Ambushes in Europe
Trasimene
Trasimene